The 2011–12 season will be Debreceni VSC's 34th competitive season, 19th consecutive season in the OTP Bank Liga (Nemzeti Bajnokság I) and 109th year in existence as a football club.

First team squad

Transfers

Summer

In:

Out:

Winter

In:

Out:

List of Hungarian football transfer summer 2011
List of Hungarian football transfers winter 2011–12

Pre-season and friendlies

Competitions

Nemzeti Bajnokság I

League table

Results summary

Results by round

Matches

Hungarian Cup

League Cup

Group stage

Classification

Knockout phase

Statistics

Appearances and goals
Last updated on 27 May 2012.

|-
|colspan="14"|Youth players

|-
|colspan="14"|Players currently out on loan

|-
|colspan="14"|Players no longer at the club

|}

Top scorers
Includes all competitive matches. The list is sorted by shirt number when total goals are equal.

Last updated on 27 May 2012

Disciplinary record
Includes all competitive matches. Players with 1 card or more included only.

Last updated on 27 May 2012

Overall
{|class="wikitable"
|-
|Games played || 49 (30 OTP Bank Liga, 9 Hungarian Cup and 10 Hungarian League Cup)
|-
|Games won || 34 (22 OTP Bank Liga, 6 Hungarian Cup and 6 Hungarian League Cup)
|-
|Games drawn || 14 (8 OTP Bank Liga, 3 Hungarian Cup and 3 Hungarian League Cup)
|-
|Games lost || 1 (0 OTP Bank Liga, 0 Hungarian Cup and 1 Hungarian League Cup)
|-
|Goals scored || 103
|-
|Goals conceded || 40
|-
|Goal difference || +63
|-
|Yellow cards || 98
|-
|Red cards || 6
|-
|rowspan="1"|Worst discipline ||  József Varga (12 , 0 )
|-
|rowspan="1"|Best result || 6–0 (H) v Mezőkövesd-Zsóry SE – Ligakupa – 5 October 2011
|-
|rowspan="1"|Worst result || 0–4 (A) v Kecskeméti TE – Ligakupa – 28 March 2012
|-
|rowspan="3"|Most appearances ||  Stevo Nikolić (34 appearances)
|-
|  Norbert Mészáros (34 appearances)
|-
|  Mihály Korhut (34 appearances)
|-
|rowspan="1"|Top scorer ||   Adamo Coulibaly (22 goals)
|-
|Points || 116/147 (78.91%)
|-

References

External links
 Eufo
 Official Website 
 UEFA
 fixtures and results

Debreceni VSC seasons
Debrecen